John 20:13 is the thirteenth verse of the twentieth chapter of the Gospel of John in the New Testament of the Christian Bible.  This verse occurs after Mary Magdalene has found Jesus' tomb empty, except for two angels.

Content
In this passage the angels ask Mary why she is crying, the King James Version of the Bible stating:

And they say unto her, Woman, 
why weepest thou? She saith unto 
them, Because they have taken 
away my lord, and I know not 
where they have laid him

For a collection of other versions see BibleHub John 20:13

Analysis
The contrast between Mary's bewilderment in this episode and the dramatic change that takes place immediately thereafter is also reflected in the iconography of the corresponding scenes. The depiction of Mary's confusion in her encounter with the angels is often attributed to Matthew 28:13 in which the guards are paid to say that the body had been stolen. The somewhat bleak iconography of this scene is then often contrasted with the brilliant lights that shine from a resurrected Jesus after he has been recognized.

The role of the angels presented in the Gospel of John during the resurrection narrative is far less than in the synoptic gospels, with John placing much of the weight on the following encounter between Mary and a resurrected Jesus.

See also
 Noli me tangere

References

20:13
John 20:13
John 20:13
Angelic apparitions in the Bible